Monreal may refer to:

Places
 Monreal, Navarre, a town in Navarre, Spain
 Monreal del Llano, a town in the province of Cuenca, Spain
 Monreal del Campo, a town in Aragón, Spain
 Monreal, Masbate, a municipality in the Philippines
 Monreal, Germany, a municipality in Rhineland-Palatinate, Germany

Castle 
 Monreal Castle, also called the Löwenburg, a castle above Monreal, Germany

Other uses
Monreal (surname)